Kentucky Down Under is an Australia-themed animal park located in Horse Cave, Kentucky, United States.

In 1990, the park was opened by Bill and Judy Austin to the public.

Bill Austin was manager of Mammoth Onyx Cave (which was later renamed Kentucky Caverns), which his grandfather had purchased in the 1920s. Peacocks and other small animals had been added to the park for visitors to enjoy on the surface in-between cave tours. A herd of American bison was added in the 1970s, followed by the Australian animals in 1990, and the park renamed to "Kentucky Down Under".

Activities 

Kentucky Down Under Zoo provides a variety of activities:

 Animal exhibits: Staff located in each area to answer questions. There are "encounter" areas where guides let visitors interact with animals (draft horses, kangaroos, lorikeets, etc).
 Mammoth Onyx Cave tours: Guides discuss geology and the importance of the cave system.
 Land of the Lorikeets: Walk-in aviary.
 Woolshed: Visitors learn about sheep, herding dogs, and wool production. 
 Gem mining: Dig and sift through sand/soil for a variety of gemstones.
 Carriage rides: Guided tour of the zoo via a horse-drawn carriage.

Kentucky Down Under hosts school groups via partly guided tours, with staff in each area of the zoo to answer questions about the exhibited animals; however, chaperons/teachers are responsible for supervising members of their respective groups.

Animals 
The zoo has a multitude of animals in their care ranging mostly of Australian but also exotic animals from around the globe including Africa, Europe, and Asia. 
 White Bison
 American Alligator
 Wolves
 Coatimundi
 Fainting Goats
 Woma Pythons 
 Fox
 Dingoes 
 Laughing Kookaburras
 Cockatiels 
 Sun Conure 
 Umbrella Cockatoo
 Grey Parrot 
 Blue-and-Yellow Macaw
 Scarlet Macaw
 Salmon Crested Cockatoo
 Ring-Tailed Lemurs 
 Rainbow Lorikeets
 Sulcata Tortoise
 Draft Horses - Belgian and Shire
 Kangaroos
 Emus
 Patagonian Cavy/Mara 
 Indian Peafowl
 Llamas
 Miniature Horse
 Southdown Sheep
 Border Collie Sheep Herding Dogs
 Brown Swiss Milk Cow
 Miniature Zebu Cow
 Serval Cat

Notes

External links 

Zoos in Kentucky
Buildings and structures in Hart County, Kentucky
Tourist attractions in Hart County, Kentucky
1990 establishments in Kentucky
Zoos established in 1990